The Parque da Mônica (lit. Monica's Park) is a theme park based the characters created by the Brazilian cartoonist Maurício de Sousa. The first park had been designed by Maurício in 1993 at Shopping Eldorado in São Paulo, having operated until February 2010 when it definitively ended its activities due to contractual problems with the mall's administrators and debts. Since then, Maurício has been in negotiations to reopen it in another location. A new park opened at Shopping SP Market on July 4, 2015, at the location of the extinct O Mundo da Xuxa. In 17 years of activities, until 2010, the park received more than 9 million visitors.

In addition to the São Paulo park, there have already been two branches: one at the Città América mall in Rio, which operated from 2000 to 2005, and another at Shopping Estação in Curitiba, which operated from 1998 to 2000. There was also a smaller park called Estação Turma da Mônica, opened in 2004 in Campinas. In July 2018, a new Estação da Turma da Mônica was inaugurated at Shopping Cerrado in the city of Goiânia, Goiás. In the following year, MSP opened another Turma da Mônica station in Olinda, Pernambuco. In addition to Brazil, Maurício opened the park's first international branch in 2010 in the city of Luanda, capital of Angola.

Comic book 
It was also launched in 1993, together with the first park, a monthly comic book called Revista Parque da Mônica (lit. Monica's Park Magazine). The publication contained the opening stories taking place at the location and was also used to publicize news and new attractions. After moving to Panini, in 2007, the comic book was renamed Turma da Mônica: Uma Aventura no Parque da Mônica (lit. Mônica's Gang: A Adventure in Monica's Park). With the end of the establishment at Shopping Eldorado, the comic book changed its name once again to just Turma da Mônica and the opening stories were no longer set in the park.

References 

Monica's Gang
Amusement parks in Brazil
1993 establishments in Brazil
Brazilian comics titles